Grand Ayatollah Mohammad-Taqi Bahjat Foumani (24 August 1916 – 17 May 2009) was an Iranian Twelver Shia Marja'.

Biography 
Ayatullah Mohammad-Taqi was born on 24 August 1916 in the Fouman, Gilan province in the north of Iran. Mohammad's mother died when he was at an early age and he lived with father. Bahjat's father sold cookies to gain as income. He started his primary education from Fouman. At the age 14, he went to Karbala and Najaf, Iraq for continuing his education in advance level. After returning to Iran on 1945, he resided in Qom and at the Qom Seminary, Mohammad-Taqi taught jurisprudence and theology.

Teachers 
While he lived in Najaf, he was a student of Abu l-Hasan al-Isfahani, Shaikh Muhammad Kadhim Shirazi, Mirza Hussein Naini, Agha Zia Addin Araghi, and Shaikh Muhammad Hussain al-Gharawi. Also, Ali Tabatabaei (known as Ayatollah Qadhi) was his teacher in spirituality and gnosticism. In Qom, he attended the class of Ayatollah Seyyed Hossein Borujerdi.

Students 
He had many students including: Morteza Motahhari, Abdollah Javadi-Amoli, Mohammad Mohammadi Gilani, Mohammad Yazdii, Ahmad Azari Qomi, Mohammad-Taqi Mesbah-Yazdi, Abbas Mahfuzi, Mahdi Hosseini Rohani, Syed shaji moqtar Hyderabadi, Azizollah Khoshvaght, Mohammad Ali Aminian, Sadeq Ehsan-Bakhsh, Mohammad Iamn Lahiji, Mohammad Ali Faize Gilani, Zaynolabideen Ghorbani, Mohammad Vasef Gilani, Ali Akbar Masoudi Khomeini, Mohammad Hossein Ahmadi Yazdi, Mohammad Hasan Ahmadi Yazdi, Reza Khosroshahi, Mahmud Amjad Kermanshahi, Abdolmajid Rashidpor, Mohammad Hadi Feqgi, Mahdi Hadavi, Sheykh Aziz Aliyari Ardebili, Abdollah Khaefi Gilani, Mojtaba Rodbari, and Ja'far Shojuni.

Legacy 
He started teaching Kharij al-Fiqh and the Usool since early 1960 and served approximately 50 years in teaching theological subjects at his house. He composed poems of praise and eulogy for the Ahl al-Bayt, especially Imam Al-Husayn, which he had originally written in Persian. He left behind a large number of compilations, including: Kitab-e Salaat, Jama'e al-Masa’el, Zakhirah al-Ebaad Leyawm al-Maa`d, Tuzih al-Masaa'il, and Manaasek-e Hajj.

Most famous mystical advice he kept repeating 
'[according to the Quran] if we act according to what we are sure about and be cautious about what we don't know, God reveals the path'

Death 
On 17 May 2009, Bahjat died in Qom at the age of 92 . He was buried in the Fatima Masumeh Shrine.

See also 

 List of Maraji

References

External links

 Pictures of Ayatollah Bahjat
 Political Advice of Ayatollah Bahjat

1913 births
2009 deaths
Iranian grand ayatollahs
Iranian religious leaders
People from Gilan Province
Iranian Muslim mystics
Burials at Fatima Masumeh Shrine